The Song of Moses is the name sometimes given to the poem which appears in Deuteronomy  of the Hebrew Bible, which according to the Bible was delivered just prior to Moses' death on Mount Nebo. Sometimes the Song is referred to as Deuteronomy 32, despite the fact that strictly speaking Deuteronomy chapter 32 contains nine verses (44–52) which are not part of the Song.

Most scholars hold that it was composed between the tenth and eighth centuries BCE, although dates as early as the twelfth century or as late as the fifth have been proposed.

Biblical narrative

YHVH told Moses to write down the words of a song and teach it to the community, so that it would be a "witness for Me against the children of Israel."  states that Moses did as he had been instructed, and in  he then "spoke in the hearing of all the assembly of Israel the words of this song until they were ended".

 contains the text of the Song.

The Song opens with an exordium (verses 1–3) in which heaven and earth are summoned to hear what the poet is to utter. In verses 4–6 the theme is defined: it is the rectitude and faithfulness of YHVH toward His corrupt and faithless people. Verses 7–14 portray the providence which conducted Israel in safety through the wilderness and gave it a rich and fertile land. Verses 15–18 are devoted to Israel's unfaithfulness and lapse into idolatry. This lapse had compelled YHVH to threaten it (verses 19–27) with national disaster and almost with national extinction. Verses 28–43 describe how YHVH has determined to speak to the Israelites through the extremity of their need, to lead them to a better mind, and to grant them victory over their foes.

In a Torah scroll the song is written with a special layout, in two parallel columns.

Critical view 
The parallelism is unusually regular.

The general plan of the poem resembles that of Psalm 78, 105, and 106, and the prose of Ezekiel 29, as well as the allegories of Ezekiel 26 and 33.

The poem opening verse is also echoed in the opening of Isaiah.

Scholarly views

According to the modern documentary hypothesis the poem was an originally separate text that was inserted by the deuteronomist into the second edition (of 2), of the text which became Deuteronomy (i.e., was an addition in 'Dtr2').

The poem, cast partly in the future tense, describes how Yahweh is provoked into punishing the Israelites due to their apostasy, resulting in the Israelites being destroyed. Dtr2 is believed to have been produced as a reaction to the Kingdom of Judah being sent into its Babylonian exile, and thus to Dtr1's (the hypothesised first edition of Deuteronomy) positive outlook, and suggestion of an upcoming golden age, being somewhat no longer appropriate. Consequently, the poem fits the aim of Dtr2, in retroactively accounting for Israel's misfortune, and, indeed, may have been composed at a similar time.

Though both Jewish and Christian sources have traditionally attributed the Song to Moses, the conditions presupposed by the poem render the Mosaic authorship of it impossible according to critical commentary. The Exodus and the wilderness wanderings lie in the distant past. The writer's contemporaries may learn of them from their fathers (verse 7). The Israelites are settled in Canaan (verses 13–14); sufficient time has passed for them not only to fall into idolatry (verses 15–19), but to be brought to the verge of ruin. They are pressed hard by heathen foes (verse 30); but Yahweh promises to interpose and rescue his people (verses 34–43).

Dating the Song
There are differences of opinion as to precisely when and by whom the song was written. George E. Mendenhall from the University of Michigan assigns it to the period just after the defeat of the Israelite militia at the battle of Eben-Ezer, and its authorship to the prophet Samuel:

"The poem cannot have originated at any time than after the destruction of Shiloh" and "... there is an impressive number of linguistic correlations in this text with the language and idioms of the syllabic texts from Byblos; those correlations also cluster around Exodus 15, Judges 5, Deuteronomy 33, and Genesis 49".

When all of Deuteronomy 31:14–23 was referred to JE, the poem was believed to be anterior thereto, and was believed to be contemporary with the Assyrian wars under Jehoash and Jeroboam II (c. 780 BCE). To this period it is referred by August Dillmann, Schrader, Samuel Oettli, Heinrich Ewald, Adolf Kamphausen and Edouard Guillaume Eugène Reuss. Kuenen and Driver, who believe that the expression "those which are not a people" in verse 21 refers to the Assyrians, assign the poem to the age of Jeremiah and Ezekiel (c. 630 BCE); while Cornill, Steuernagel, and Bertholet refer it to the closing years of the Exile, i.e., the period of the second Isaiah.

Similarity to other places in the Old Testament
Isaiah 1:2 begins similar to Deuteronomy 32:1 by calling on heaven and earth as witnesses, making Isaiah's introduction in the style of the Song of Moses.

Psalm 50 in Psalm 50:1 and Psalm 50:4 will also begin the same as Deuteronomy 32:1, making that Psalm poetically also in the style of the Song of Moses.

Musical settings
Disambiguation; for Cantemus Domino see Song of the Sea.
 Audite cæli quæ loquor, grand motet, S.7 by Michel Richard Delalande.
 Audite caeli by Francesco Provenzale.
 Song of Moses for solo snare drum by Jason Bahr.

Both Songs of Moses, as with Habakkuk 3 (Domine Audivi), and 1 Samuel 2 (Exultavit Cor Meum) are counted as canticles in church use.

See also
 Territorial Spirit
 Haazinu

References

Further reading
 
 Mendenhall, George E., Samuel's "Broken Rîb": Deuteronomy 32, 1975, Reprint from No Famine in the Land Studies in Honor of John L. McKenzie. Scholar's Press for The Institute for Antiquity and Christianity - Claremont
 
 Jewish Encyclopedia bibliography:
 Kamphausen, A., Das Lied Moses: Deut. 32, 1–43, 1862; Leipzig: Brockhaus
 Klostermann, A., in Studien und Kritiken, 1871, pp. 249 et seq.; 1872, pp. 230 et seq., 450 et seq.;
 Stade's Zeitschrift, 1885, pp. 297 et seq.;
 Cornill, C. H., Einleitung in das Alte Testament, 1891, pp. 70 et seq.,
 Driver, S. R., Deuteronomy, in International Critical Commentary, 1895, pp. 344 et seq.;
 Steuernagel, Deuteronomium, in Nowack's Handkommentar, 1900, pp. 114 et seq.;
 Bertholet, Deuteronomium, in K. H. C. 1899, pp. 94 et seq.;

External links
 Michael S. Heiser, Deuteronomy 32:8 and the Sons of God

Texts attributed to Moses
Book of Deuteronomy
Canticles